The Gathering of the Juggalos (also known as The Gathering or GOTJ) is an annual music festival put on by Psychopathic Records, featuring performances by the entire label roster as well as numerous well-known musical groups and underground artists. It was founded by Jumpsteady, Insane Clown Posse (Joseph Bruce and Joseph Utsler), and their label in 2000. Described by Joseph Bruce as a "Juggalo Woodstock" (Juggalo being a nickname for fans of the Insane Clown Posse), the Gathering of the Juggalos spans five days and includes concerts, wrestling, games, contests, autograph sessions, karaoke, and seminars with artists. Over its first eleven events (2000–2010), the festival drew a total attendance upward of 100,000 fans.

History

Early years (2000–2002) 

The Gathering of the Juggalos was created in 1999 when Rob Bruce organized an event for all Juggalos, a concept long talked about by Insane Clown Posse. The first Gathering took place in Novi, Michigan at the Novi Expo Center on July 2122, 2000, with over 7,000 fans in attendance. The festival featured concert performances and wrestling hosted by Juggalo Championship Wrestling. While performing on the final night, Insane Clown Posse asked the Juggalos to join them onstage, and about 300 fans rushed onto the stage. After performing for almost 30 more minutes, the concert was abruptly stopped by the venue's management.

The second Gathering of the Juggalos was held in Toledo, Ohio at the Seagate Center on July 1315, 2001, with approximately 6,600 in attendance. Outside artists included The Suicide Machines, Marz, Three 6 Mafia, Vanilla Ice, and Bone Thugs-n-Harmony. Juggalo Championship wrestling hosted several matches, with the main event pitting Sabu against Vampiro for the JCW Heavyweight Championship.

Like the previous year, hundreds of fans charged the main stage during Insane Clown Posse's performance. However, this time the group was forced to flee the stage before it collapsed. The festival ended early before the duo could reveal their Sixth Joker's Card. The next day, local newspapers reported the rush as a "riot".

The third annual Gathering of the Juggalos was held in the Civic Center in Peoria, Illinois July 1921, 2002, with over 8,000 in attendance. Esham, Ghoultown, Mack 10, Primer 55, and Bubba Sparxxx were among the guest performers. Bubba Sparxxx was booed offstage and has since left a mark on future Gatherings, as acts sharing similar fates have been said to receive the "Bubba Sparxxx award." Esham announced at the event that he had signed with Psychopathic Records. The Sixth Joker's Card was unveiled in two separate seminars, The Wraith: Shangri-La and Hell's Pit, given by ViolentJ. The second seminar, detailing Insane Clown Posse's entire rise to fame, was captured on video and released with The Wraith: Shangri-La on DVD.

A riot occurred after police tried to stop female attendees from showing their breasts. The police released tear gas and pepper balls into the surrounding crowd, causing mass confusion. Psychopathic Record employees Rob Bruce and Alex Abbiss negotiated with police, and the festival continued after airing out for 30 minutes.

Expansion and development (2003–2006) 

In 2003, the Juggalo Gathering was held outdoors for the first time. The event took place at Nelson Ledges Quarry Park, known as "the Crystal Forest", near Garrettsville, Ohio in Nelson Township, July 1720. It was also the first time the festival went on for 24hours every day. Guest performers included Bushwick Bill, Dope, and Killah Priest. In addition to the wrestling matches, Mad Man Pondo hosted Mad Man Pondo's Wrestling School. Though multiple police were called to watch over the event by Garrettsville residents, the Gathering went off without any problems.

The fifth annual Gathering of the Juggalos returned to Garrettsville July 1518, with over 5,000 in attendance. Ol' Dirty Bastard, Kurupt, Tech N9ne, and Wolfpac were among those who performed. Kurupt got booed off the stage by the attendees and retaliated by throwing a microphone into the audience. Bone Thugs-n-Harmony also reunited for the first time in several months by making a surprise performance on opening night. Juggalo Championship Wrestling hosted matches every day, and featured several established wrestlers.

The Gathering of the Juggalos returned to Garrettsville for a third time in 2005 on July 2124. Guest performers included 2 Live Crew, Powerman 5000, Manntis, and Mini Kiss. Charlie Murphy was also brought in as one of the stand-up comedians. The Gathering hosted the final round of the Underground Psychos contest, in which the winner, Axe Murder Boyz, was signed to Psychopathic Records. Juggalo Championship Wrestling held the event "JCW vs. TNA" which pitted JCW wrestlers against TNA wrestlers.

Quarry Park's owner, Evan Kelley, kicked the festival off his grounds later that year. He stated, "Psychopathic Records broke some of the rules set down for the 2005 event, including blasting music all night long." He also explained that "Drugs, alcohol, nudity, profanity, and trash also became serious problems."

The seventh annual Gathering of the Juggalos was set to take place in Brooklyn, Michigan, however, the board of Woodstock Township, Michigan denied the label the permits needed to hold the event. On April 18, Psychopathic Records announced that the Gathering would be held in Pataskala, Ohio at Frontier Ranch July 1316, 2006. The festival featured over 100 bands. Those playing at the main and second stages included Drowning Pool, Digital Underground, Rehab, Too $hort, Intricate Unit, Bobaflex, and Vile.

Cave-In-Rock (2007–2013) 

Cave-In-Rock, Illinois hosted the eighth Gathering of the Juggalos at Hogrock Campgrounds on August 912, 2007, with over 8,000 fans attending the four-day event. Like the previous year, over 100 bands were featured. Performances on the main and second stages included Ying Yang Twins, Necro, Haystak, Zug Izland, Prozak, Mushroomhead, and Insane Poetry. Comedians included Joey Gay. Bloodymania, the culmination of Juggalo Championship Wrestling's web show, SlamTV!, debuted at the event. Anybody Killa was also announced to have signed back with Psychopathic Records.

Cave-In-Rock also hosted the ninth Gathering of the Juggalos on August 710, 2008, which included guest performances by Afroman, Andrew W.K., Ice-T, and Bizarre. Both Bloodymania II and the debut of Oddball Wrestling was presented by Juggalo Championship Wrestling. The Gathering was filmed by Psychopathic Video for the documentary A Family Underground, which was released on May 12, 2009.

The tenth Gathering of the Juggalos August 69, had the largest attendance in Gathering history with over 20,000 people. Over 120 musical artists performed at the event, including Ice Cube, Gwar, Coolio, and Scarface. During their set, Insane Clown Posse debuted the songs "Juggalo Island" and "Bang! Pow! Boom!" from their then-upcoming album Bang! Pow! Boom! Juggalo Championship Wrestling hosted Bloodymania III, Oddball Wrestling, and Flashlight Wrestling. Stand-up comedians included Jimmie Walker and Pauly Shore. The trailer for Big Money Rustlas also premiered during the event, where it was screened twice.

In honor of the Western comedy film Big Money Rustlas being released at the event, the eleventh Gathering of the Juggalos featured a "Best in the West" West Coast hip hop theme. Guest performances include Naughty by Nature, Spice 1, Method Man & Redman, Above the Law, and Warren G. A "Ladies' Night", hosted by Sugar Slam, featured performances by Kisa, LilV, IllE.Gal, and Tila Tequila. Shaggy 2 Dope hosted "Shaggy's Old School Super Jam", featuring DJing by 2Dope and performances by Tone Lōc and Rob Base. Comedy was provided by Tom Green, Gallagher, and Ron Jeremy. Five wrestling shows were booked for the event; Oddball Wrestling, Bloodymania IV, two Flashlight Wrestling events, and an event featuring the cast of Half Pint Brawlers.

The twelfth annual Gathering of the Juggalos August 1114, 2011, debuted the use of a celebrity host for each night's main stage with Dustin Diamond, Jumpsteady, Charlie Sheen, and Flavor Flav. Guest acts included artists Busta Rhymes, Mystikal, Juvenile, Lil Jon, George Clinton and Parliament-Funkadelic, Saliva, Ice Cube, Xzibit, and Paris. All of the main stage performances, as well as the wrestling events Bloodymania 5 and Legends & Icons, were broadcast live on internet pay-per-view. It was also announced that Vanilla Ice had signed with Psychopathic Records.

The thirteenth annual gathering took place from August 812, 2012, at Cave-In-Rock and featured Insane Clown Posse, Twiztid, Psychopathic Rydas, Dark Lotus, Blaze Ya Dead Homie, ABK, comedian Ralphie May, DJ Clay, Mike E. Clark, and Cold 187 AKA Big Hutch. Some other guest artists and groups included Tech N9ne, The Pharcyde, Soulfly, Fear Factory, Cheech & Chong, Danny Brown, Slaine, ¡Mayday! & the Geto Boys. A volume of photographs by Daniel Cronin from the event has been published, showing predominantly the people attending the event, not the performers.

The fourteenth annual gathering took place from August 711, 2013, at Cave-In-Rock. This was the final time the event was held at Cave-In-Rock.

Legend Valley Ohio, Oklahoma City, Springville and Crystal  Forest (2014–present) 

In February 2014, it was announced that the Gathering would be moving from its home at Cave-in-Rock to a family Campground in Kaiser, Missouri. However, several local citizens vigorously protested the Gathering being held in this location and the event had to be moved once more. It was reported by Insane Clown Posse themselves that locals had started a petition to keep the Gathering out of their area and flooded the owners of the campground with angry phone calls. Finally, a self-professed Juggalo referred to as Steve (who had previously been to the Gathering himself) contacted Psychopathic Records and offered the 120-acre Legend Valley as a place to host the event. Legend Valley (located in Thornville, Ohio) was officially chosen as the Gathering's venue for 2014. In a statement by Psychopathic Records in the February 28, 2014 edition of the Hatchet Herald, it was said that "Mere hours after the news begin spreading that Kaiser, Missouri would not welcome the Juggalo Family, we began receiving phone calls and emails from interested land owners and promoters who wanted to help ensure that the Gathering of the Juggalos found a home. One of the calls we got was from a down-ass ninja named Steve who owns the Legend Valley. [...] Steve has actually been to the Gathering of the Juggalos before and is not buying into the media's portrayal of what the Gathering is because he has been there. He has expressed to us that he is super down to host the Gathering this year and has always found Juggalos to be cool ass people. He also believes in our fight alongside the ACLU to have Juggalos removed from the FBI gang list, which is still on the list as a "loosely organized hybrid gang" because their sorry ass case was thrown out of court in 2014. In other words, he has our backs and is the perfect ninja we needed to ensure an awesome, trouble-free Gathering this year."

Legend Valley, Ohio hosted the fifteenth annual Gathering of the Juggalos, which took place between July 23, 2014, and July 26, 2014. Advertised as "Shangri-La on Earth", this Gathering has over 70 artists scheduled to perform, including the entire Psychopathic Records roster and several notable guests such as Twiztid, Blaze Ya Dead Homie, Cypress Hill, Cannibal Corpse, Kottonmouth Kings, Tech N9ne, Da Mafia 6ix, and other artists. Also scheduled to perform are several comedians, including (most notably) Gilbert Gottfried. Three special parties are planned for the gathering: Kuma's Psychopathic All-Star Party, DJClay's Horney Nuts and Big Butts Party, and the Frothy Murder Mix Foam Party. Alongside all these events will be dance competitions, several contests, and Juggalo Championship Wrestling events (including JCW's Road to Bloodymania and Bloodymania 8), plus carnival rides, the annual ICP seminar, auctions, and more. In addition, it was announced via the Insane Clown Posse's Twitter account that there was to be a new Dark Lotus album slated for the 2014 Gathering.

It was announced at the Insane Clown Posse seminar at Legend Valley that the Gathering of the Juggalos would be held in Colorado in 2017. On April 11, Faygoluvers.net announced that GOTJ18 would be held in Oklahoma City, Oklahoma at the Lost Lakes Amphitheater on July 2629, 2017. GOTJ19 was scheduled to return to Legend Valley on July 1821, 2018.

On January 31, 2019, during the Juggalo show, it was announced that the 20th annual GOTJ would take place in Springville, Indiana at Lawrence County Recreational Park from July 31August 3, 2019.

On January 6, 2020, ICP announced on social media that the 21st annual Gathering of the Juggalos would return to Garrettsville, Ohio at Nelson Ledges Quarry Park "Crystal Forest" for the first time in 15 years to be held  August 58, 2020. On April 22, 2020, however, the concert was canceled for the year due to the COVID-19 pandemic.

Performers

Over the years, several hundred artists have performed at the Gathering of the Juggalos. Outside of the label's roster, regular performers include Project Born, Kottonmouth Kings, Bone Thugs-n-Harmony, Vanilla Ice, Zug Izland, Esham, Natas, Side Weighs, Tech N9ne, Wolfpac, 2 Live Crew, Rehab, Necro, Haystak, King Gordy, Brotha Lynch Hung, Prozak, Three 6 Mafia, Afroman, Bizarre, Big B, George Clinton and Parliament, Mack 10, Delusional, and Coolio.

Notable guest performances have included Bubba Sparxxx, Blind Insanity, Lil Wyte, Psychostick, Killah Priest, Bushwick Bill, Ol' Dirty Bastard, Kurupt, Powerman 5000, Digital Underground, Drowning Pool, Too $hort, Ying Yang Twins, Mushroomhead, Andrew W.K., Ice Cube, Gwar, Scarface, Naughty by Nature, Spice 1, Ralphie May, Method Man & Redman, Above the Law, Warren G, Tila Tequila, Tone Lōc, Rob Base, Busta Rhymes, Hopsin, Mystikal, Juvenile, Lil Jon, Saliva, Xzibit, Paris, Soulfly, Fear Factory, Static-X, P.O.D., MC Lars, Cheech & Chong, The Pharcyde, The Fat Boys, Millionaires, Kool Keith, Onyx, Danny Brown, Slaine, Master P, Raekwon, Swollen Members, DMIZE, Goest Ryder, Clownvis Presley, and Geto Boys.

Activities
In addition to musical concerts, the Gathering of the Juggalos features multiple activities. Throughout the site there are carnival rides, Midway Games, and helicopter rides. Other events include Juggalo Karaoke, an Open mic, comedy, ladies oil wrestling, a wet T-shirt contest, a Ms. Juggalette competition, and Hog Daddy's Hellfire. Autograph signings and seminars are held by Juggalo Championship Wrestling, Mike E. Clark, Axe Murder Boyz, Blaze Ya Dead Homie, Anybody Killa, Boondox, Twiztid, and Insane Clown Posse.

Several late night parties also occur, including Ladies Night hosted by Sugar Slam, Mike E. Clark's Murder Mix Party, DJ Clay's Bubble Houseparty, Shaggy's Old School Super Jam, and Violent J's Michael Jackson Moonwalk BBQ Blowout Pajama Jam. Professional wrestling has been a prevalent feature of the event since its inception. Juggalo Championship Wrestling currently hosts JCW Try-Outs, Oddball Wrestling, Flashlight Wrestling, and Bloodymania at every Gathering event.

Popular media
Psychopathic Records’ infomercial for the 2009 Gathering of the Juggalos was parodied on the television sketch comedy Saturday Night Live. The sketch, titled "Kickspit Underground Rock Festival", aired on the December 5 edition of the show. Joseph Bruce stated that he was not offended by the parody, and that he thought that the sketch was "hilarious" and "a humongous compliment". The "Kickspit Underground Rock Festival" has since become a recurring series of sketches.

Performer Tila Tequila was hit with bottles at the 2010 event, which resulted in coverage by numerous media outlets. Tila claimed that she would sue Juggalo Gathering LLC, but never did. In 2011, the hit television show Workaholics aired an episode called "Straight Up Juggahos". The episode revolved around an Insane Clown Posse concert, which acted as a direct parody of the Gathering of the Juggalos. In June 2011, comedy troupe Upright Citizens Brigade received a cease and desist from Insane Clown Posse for titling one of their performances "The Gathering Of The Juggalos For A Mother Fucking Baby Funeral."

In 2013, the FilmDrunk Frotcast launched a successful Kickstarter campaign to create a documentary studying the Gathering from an outsider's perspective. The group consisted of photographer Ben Kaplan, comedian Matt Lieb, and film critics Vince Mancini and Laremy Legel. The film, titled Whoop Dreams, premiered in 2014 to decent reviews, and Mancini and Legel have written articles and essays about their experiences.

In 2018 the mobile game ICP: The Gathering was released for iOS and Google Play.  The game lets players create their own Gathering of the Juggalos festival.

In 2023, Vice Media posted a Youtube video focusing on the Gathering in which a Vice reporter attends and takes part in the events.

References

Further reading

External links
 Official website
 Broadcast website

Hardin County, Illinois
Insane Clown Posse
Heavy metal festivals in the United States
Psychopathic Records
2000 establishments in Illinois
Music festivals established in 2000
Music festivals in Illinois
Music festivals in Ohio
Music festivals in Oklahoma